Standard Liège had a successful season, qualifying for the UEFA Champions League pre-group stage phase, thanks to a 2nd-place finish in the First Division. This was the last season for Dominique D'Onofrio in charge of Standard, leaving at the end of the season, to be replaced by Johan Boskamp.

Squad

Goalkeepers
  Olivier Renard
  Vedran Runje

Defenders
  Jorge Costa
  Philippe Léonard
  Mathieu Béda
  Mohamed Sarr
  Ivica Dragutinović
  Oguchi Onyewu
  Eric Deflandre
  Michel
  Lovre Vulin

Midfielders
  Milan Rapaić
  Karel Geraerts 
  Christian Negouai
  Sérgio Conceição
  Jonathan Walasiak
  Carlos Alberto
  Siramana Dembélé
  Serhiy Kovalenko

Attackers
  Mohammed Tchité
  Sambégou Bangoura
  Almami Moreira
  Daniel Niculae
  Igor de Camargo

First League

Matches

Top Scorers
  Mohammed Tchité 16
  Milan Rapaić 7 (1)
  Sérgio Conceição 7
  Daniel Niculae 4

Sources
   RSSSF - Belgium 2005/06

Standard Liège seasons
Standard Liege